Primm Valley Golf Club is a part of the Primm Valley Resort and is located south of Primm, Nevada in San Bernardino County, California.

The Golf Club includes the Lakes Course and the Desert Course.

History
In 2007, the club was host to the inaugural World Series of Golf tournament.

References

External links
 

1997 establishments in California
Golf clubs and courses in California
MGM Resorts International
Sports venues in San Bernardino County, California